Fethiye Mosque can refer to a number of Ottoman mosques dedicated to the conquest (Fatih) of a city or region:

 Fethiye Mosque in Istanbul, the former Byzantine church of the Pammakaristos Monastery
 Fethiye Mosque (Athens), in Athens, Greece
 Fethiye Mosque (Ioannina), in Ioannina, Greece
 Fethiye Mosque (Krujë), in Krujë, Albania
 Fethiye Mosque (Naupactus), in Naupactus, Greece

See also 
 Fethija Mosque (Bihać)
 Fatih Mosque (disambiguation)